Oysterponds Union Free School District is a public school district located in the Town of Southold Suffolk County, New York, United States.  It is the easternmost school district on the North Fork of Long Island.  The district includes the census-designated places (CDPs) of East Marion and Orient.  To the west, the district is bordered by the Greenport Union Free School District.

The total enrollment for the 2015–2016 school year was 80 students. , Oysterponds Union Free School District has 86 students. At the beginning of the 2013–2014 school year, the school district introduced Combined Grade Classes into their only school, Oysterponds Elementary School, combining Fifth and Sixth Grade students into the class of Intermediate II, Fourth and Third Grade students into the class of Intermediate I, First and Second Grade Students into the class of Primary II, and the Kindergarten and Pre-School classes into the class of Primary I.

The superintendent is Richard C. Malone, and the principal/teacher is Jennifer Wissemann.

Schools
The only school operated by the district is Oysterponds Elementary School (Grades K-6).  Currently, the district pays for middle and high school students (grades 7–12) to be educated in the adjacent Greenport school district.

Proposals to merge the school district with its neighbors to the west have been discussed in the past, but have not been approved.

References

External links
 Oysterponds Union Free School District Website

Southold, New York
School districts in New York (state)
Education in Suffolk County, New York